The New Zealand cricket team toured Sri Lanka in 1987, with the intention of playing three test matches and three one day internationals.  The first test at Colombo Cricket Club Ground ended in a draw.  The second and third Tests were both cancelled because of civil disturbances. The tour was cut short due to a bomb exploding near the New Zealand team's hotel in Colombo. The terrorist bomb responsible for killing 113 civilians was planted by the Tamil Tigers separatist movement and was not targeted towards the touring New Zealand cricket team. However, the team voted overwhelmingly to return home after just one Test of the scheduled three-Test tour. In the aftermath of the incident, no international tours of Sri Lanka were undertaken until 1992.

Test series summary

First Test

Second Test

Third Test

References

1987 in New Zealand cricket
1987 in Sri Lankan cricket
International cricket competitions from 1985–86 to 1988
1986-87
Sri Lankan cricket seasons from 1972–73 to 1999–2000
Cricket  tours abandoned due to terrorism